The 2016 Chiloé earthquake with a magnitude of  7.6 struck  south-west of Puerto Montt in southern Chile at 11:22 local time, 25 December. Although there was damage in some parts of the island, the government reported no casualties.

Earthquake 
The earthquake occurred as a result of shallow thrust faulting in southern Chile. At the location of the earthquake, the oceanic Nazca plate converges with and subducts beneath the South America plate in an east-northeast direction, at a rate of approximately 73 mm/yr. The location, depth and shallow thrusting focal mechanism solution all indicate this earthquake likely occurred on the subduction zone interface.

Tsunami

See also 
List of earthquakes in 2016
List of earthquakes in Chile

References

External links

2016 earthquakes
2016 in Chile
Earthquakes in Chile
December 2016 events in South America